Bekwel (Bekwil) is a Bantu language of the Republic of the Congo. There are some 10,000 speakers there, with a quarter that number across the border in Gabon, and perhaps a similar on the opposite side in Cameroon. It is rather close to Nzime (Koonzime).

Maho (2009) considers Nkonabeeb (Konabembe) to be a dialect of Bekwil rather than of Mpumpong.

References

Languages of the Republic of the Congo
Makaa-Njem languages